Eibert Johannes Calvinus Tigchelaar (born 1959, Sint Anthoniepolder) is a leading authority and author on the subject of the Dead Sea Scrolls. Formerly he held the position of research associate at the Qumran Instituut (Qumran Institute), Rijksuniversiteit Groningen (University of Groningen), was appointed to a professorship at Florida State University, before becoming research professor at Katholieke Universiteit Leuven.

Published books
 Prophets of Old and the Day of the End: Zechariah, the Book of Watchers and Apocalypti (Brill Academic Publishers, 1996) 
 The Dead Sea Scrolls: Study Edition - Vol. 1 (Brill Academic Publishers, 1997) 
 The Dead Sea Scrolls Study Edition - Vol. 2 (Brill Academic Publishers, 1998) 
 The Dead Sea Scrolls Study Edition (William B. Eerdman's Publishing, 2000) 
 To Increase Learning for the Understanding Ones: Reading and Reconstructing the Fragmentary Early Jewish Sapiential Text 4Q (Studies on the Texts of the Desert of Judah) (Brill Academic Publishers, 2002)

Other publications
 Kennis van het Kwaad. Zeven visies uit jodendom en . Zoetermeer: Meinema, 2004.
 Sodom’s Sin. Genesis 18-19 and its Interpretations. Themes in Biblical Narrative 7. Leiden and Boston: Brill, 2004.
 Fragmenten uit de woestijn. De Dode-Zeerollen opnieuw bekeken. Zoetermeer: Meinema, 2003.
 The Sacrifice of Isaac. The Aqedah (Genesis 22) and Its Interpretations. Themes in Biblical Narrative 4. Leiden, Boston and Köln: Brill, 2002.
 To Increase Learning for the Understanding Ones. Reading and Reconstructing the Fragmentary Early Jewish Sapiential Text 4QInstruction . Studies on the Texts of the Desert of Judah 44. Leiden, Boston and Köln: Brill, 2001.
 Discoveries in the Judaean Desert XXIII: Qumran Cave 11 II, 11Q2-18, 11Q20-31 Incorporating Earlier Editions by J.P.M. van der Ploeg, O.P. with a Contribution by Edward Herbert. Oxford: Clarendon Press, 1998.

References
EJAS Scholar Details:  Dr. Eibert Tigchelaar

External links
European Association for Jewish Studies: Qumran Institute and the Dead Sea scrolls

1959 births
Living people
Dutch biblical scholars
Utrecht University alumni
University of Groningen alumni
Florida State University faculty
Academic staff of the Old University of Leuven
People from Binnenmaas